Cleardale is a hamlet in northern Alberta, Canada within Clear Hills County.

The hamlet is located in census division No. 17.  The area was formally surveyed in 1953.

Climate

Demographics 
The population of Cleardale according to the 2008 municipal census conducted by Clear Hills County is 19.

Education 
Menno Simons Community School, a K-12 public school under the jurisdiction of the Peace River School Division, is located in Cleardale.

See also 
List of communities in Alberta
List of hamlets in Alberta

References 

Clear Hills County
Hamlets in Alberta